Walter Boller (born 20 May 1951) is a German athlete. He competed in the men's high jump at the 1976 Summer Olympics, representing West Germany.

References

External links
 

1951 births
Living people
Athletes (track and field) at the 1976 Summer Olympics
German male high jumpers
Olympic athletes of West Germany
People from Waldshut (district)
Sportspeople from Freiburg (region)